
Gmina Kępice is an urban-rural gmina (administrative district) in Słupsk County, Pomeranian Voivodeship, in northern Poland.

Villages
Apart from the town of Kępice, Gmina Kępice contains the villages and settlements of Barcino, Barwino, Biesowice, Biesowiczki, Borzysław, Bronowo, Bronowo-Kolonia, Brzezinka, Chorówko, Chorowo, Ciecholub, Darnowo, Gościeradz, Jabłoniec, Jabłonna, Kaczyno, Kawka, Korzybie, Kotłowo, Kuźnik, Lipnik, Łużki, Mielęcino, Mzdowiec, Mzdówko, Mzdowo, Obłęże, Osieczki, Osieki, Osowo, Płocko, Podgóry, Podgóry-Kolonia, Polichno, Przyjezierze, Przytocko, Pustowo, Radzikowo, Szoferajka, Warcino, Wąsochy, Węgorzyno, Zawistowo, Żelice and Żelice Dolne.

Neighbouring gminas
Gmina Kępice is bordered by the gminas of Kobylnica, Miastko, Polanów, Sławno, Słupsk and Trzebielino.

References
Polish official population figures 2006

Kepice
Słupsk County

de:Kępice#Gliederung der Gemeinde Kępice